Văn Mỹ is former district of Hải Hưng province. It was formed from Văn Lâm and Mỹ Hào districts. It was merged on February 24, 1979, with Văn Yên to form Mỹ Văn district.

References 

Former districts of Vietnam